"Babe" is a song by English boy band Take That, released as the fourth single from their second album, Everything Changes (1993). Written by Gary Barlow, it features Mark Owen on lead vocals. Production was led by David Clayton, who later spent 10 years as keyboard player and backing vocalist with Simply Red. The song was a number-one hit in both Ireland and the United Kingdom while peaking within the top 10 in Belgium, Finland, Germany, Israel, Lithuania, the Netherlands, Norway, Sweden and Switzerland.

Release
Released on 6 December 1993, "Babe" became Take That's third single in a row to go straight to number one on the UK Singles Chart, knocking Mr Blobby's self-titled novelty single from the number-one slot in the process. With this achievement, Take That became the first band to have three consecutive singles debut at number one. The following week, Mr Blobby's single climbed back to number one, denying Take That the Christmas number-one place. The single sold 350,000 copies in 1993, and was that year's 14th biggest-selling single. The song was certified platinum on 1 January 1994 for shipments of over 600,000 copies in the UK.

Critical reception
AllMusic editor Bryan Buss described the song as "surprisingly risqué". Tom Ewing of Freaky Trigger noted that the melody is "murky and sad – this is as fog-bound and haunted a number one as we've seen since the high Gothic of John Leyton – and the tension gives the story a dignity." In his weekly UK chart commentary, James Masterton said, "'Babe' is another slowly with a familiar lyrical theme of the prodigal lover returning to find his ex with a child bearing his eyes etc. etc. It grows on you as well". Alan Jones from Music Week gave it four out of five, writing that "this overwrought ballad lacks the instant appeal of many of the group's previous singles. But the combination of massive media support, the Smash Hits Awards and large fanbase make it a cert." In an retrospective review, Pop Rescue noted that it "has tear-jerking lyrics and vocals from Mark", adding that "the emotions soar here as much as the dramatic strings". Leesa Daniels from Smash Hits gave "Babe" five out of five, calling it "gorgeous", and describing it as "a tale of a lost love that'll have you blubbing into your pillow for hours." She added that Owen's vocals "are the real triumph".

Music video
A music video was produced to promote the single, directed by Gregg Masuak. It was the first Take That video to involve the members acting out a story using drama. The video runs parallel to the song's lyrics, showing Owen trying to track down a loved one after coming back from war. Later in the video it emerges that Owen has fathered a child. The video uses intercut clips of the band standing around Barlow, all performing the song. The last few seconds of the video are somewhat happier, showing outtakes of the band from the video. "Babe" received heavy rotation on MTV Europe and was A-listed on Germany's VIVA.

The music video won the International Viewer's Choice Award for MTV Europe at the 1994 MTV Video Music Awards held in New York.

Track listings
 UK 7-inch and cassette single, European CD single 
 "Babe" (Return remix) – 4:55
 "All I Want Is You" – 3:21
Note: A limited-edition 7-inch version with a photo sleeve was also released.

 UK CD1 and Australian CD single 
 "Babe" (Return remix) – 4:55
 "All I Want Is You" – 3:21
 "Could It Be Magic" (live) – 6:18
 "Pray" (live) – 6:33

 UK CD2 and Japanese CD single 
 "Babe" (Return remix) – 4:55
 "It Only Takes a Minute" (live) – 3:47
 "Give Good Feeling" (live) – 3:52

Personnel
 Mark Owen – lead vocals
 Gary Barlow – backing vocals
 Howard Donald – backing vocals
 Jason Orange – backing vocals
 Robbie Williams – backing vocals

Charts

Weekly charts

Year-end charts

Certifications

References

Take That songs
1990s ballads
1993 singles
1993 songs
Bertelsmann Music Group singles
Pop ballads
RCA Records singles
Songs written by Gary Barlow
UK Singles Chart number-one singles